Kukushkin (from кукушка meaning cuckoo) is a Russian masculine surname, its feminine counterpart is Kukushkina. It may refer to

Anna Kukushkina (born 1992), Russian sprinter
Mikhail Kukushkin (born 1987), Kazakhstani tennis player
Vsevolod Kukushkin (born 1942), Soviet journalist, writer and ice hockey administrator

Russian-language surnames